The Emerging Sources Citation Index (ESCI) is a citation index produced since 2015 by Thomson Reuters, and now by Clarivate. According to the publisher, the index includes "peer-reviewed publications of regional importance and in emerging scientific fields".

The ESCI is accessible through the Web of Science, together with other Clarivate indexes. As of June 2021, all journals indexed in ESCI are also included within the Journal Citation Reports. While these journals still do not receive an impact factor, they do contribute citations to the calculation of other journals' impact factors.

Inclusion criteria
To be included in the ESCI, journals must be:
Peer reviewed
Follow ethical publishing practices
Meet technical requirements
Have English language bibliographic information
Be recommended or requested by a scholarly audience of Web of Science users

Criticism
Jeffrey Beall argued that among the databases produced by Clarivate, the ESCI is the easiest one to get into and that as a result it contains many predatory journals.

References

External links

Citation indices
Online databases
Clarivate